Thomas Jermaine Bryant (born July 31, 1997) is an American professional basketball player for the Denver Nuggets of the National Basketball Association (NBA). He played college basketball for the Indiana Hoosiers from 2015 to 2017.

High school career
Bryant played basketball at Bishop Kearney, where as a sophomore he led his team to a 17–8 record, the 2013 New York Class AA Tournament crown, and the New York Federation Tournament of Champions.

After his sophomore year, Bryant transferred to Huntington Prep School in Huntington, West Virginia during the 2014 school year. As a junior, he averaged 13.9 points, 12.9 rebounds and 2.8 blocks per game.   While there, he played on the AAU team, Team SCAN on the Nike Elite Youth Basketball League Circuit. On January 3, 2015, Bryant scored 23 points and 12 rebounds in a 89–49 win over Whitney Young. As a senior, Bryant averaged 17.3 points, 11.6 rebounds, 4.5 blocks and 2.5 steals per game. He was ranked the 20th best recruit in the 2015 class by ESPN and was recruited heavily by many schools, including Indiana, Kentucky, Syracuse, UCLA, and other power conference schools. However, his final decision came down to Indiana and Syracuse. According to Bryant's mother, who was heavily in favor of Syracuse, " [he] picked Indiana because Syracuse's basketball program was in chaos." While Bryant was trying to decide which school to attend, Syracuse was in the middle of an NCAA investigation, which eventually led to the loss of 12 scholarships over the next four years, 108 vacated wins, and Jim Boeheim being suspended for the first 9 games of the 2015–2016 ACC season.

Bryant's final verbal commitment to Indiana was televised live on April 4, 2015 during the Dick's Sporting Goods National Tournament on ESPN.

During the McDonald's All-American Game, Bryant scored 9 points and grabbed 3 rebounds in 16 minutes of play for the East team. He was the fifth consecutive McDonald's All-American Tom Crean was able to recruit to play at IU.

College career

Bryant had a break out performance in an 86–65 win against Creighton. He recorded 17 points, 7 rebounds, and 4 blocks in the Hoosiers win. Bryant contributed 19 points and five rebounds in a win over Kentucky in the NCAA Tournament. Bryant averaged 11.9 points and 5.8 rebounds per game as a freshman. After the season, Bryant was named both Big Ten All-Freshman team as well as Third-team All-Big Ten.

Bryant announced his return for his sophomore year. His shooting percentage declined as a sophomore, but Bryant averaged 12.6 points, 6.6 rebounds and 1.5 blocks per game. Bryant was projected as a possible top 5 pick in the 2017 NBA draft heading into the season along with teammate OG Anunoby .

Professional career

Los Angeles Lakers (2017–2018)
On June 22, 2017, Bryant was drafted 42nd overall in the 2017 NBA draft by the Utah Jazz. He was later traded along with the 30th pick, Josh Hart to the Los Angeles Lakers in exchange for the Lakers 28th pick, Tony Bradley. On July 30, 2017, Bryant signed his rookie scale contract with the Lakers. On June 30, 2018, the Lakers waived Bryant.

The Lakers frequently assigned Bryant to their G League affiliate, the South Bay Lakers, during the season. Following the 2017–18 season, he was named to the All-NBA G League First Team.

Washington Wizards (2018–2022) 
On July 2, 2018, Bryant was claimed off waivers by the Washington Wizards.

On December 22, 2018, Bryant shot 14–14 and scored a career-high 31 points against the Phoenix Suns, tying for the fourth most field goals made without a miss in NBA history, with only Wilt Chamberlain exceeding the 14 field goal mark.

On July 7, 2019, Bryant re-signed with the Wizards on a 3-year, $25 million contract. On July 9, 2020, he tested positive for COVID-19. On August 2, Bryant recorded season-highs of 30 points and 13 rebounds in a 110–118 loss to the Brooklyn Nets.

On January 10, 2021, the Wizards announced that Bryant had suffered a partially torn anterior cruciate ligament in his left knee during a 124–128 loss to Miami Heat a day before. The injury ended his season, with Bryant only having played ten games.

On January 12, 2022, Bryant made his return for the Wizards, scoring six points in a 112–106 win over the Orlando Magic.

Return to the Lakers (2022–2023) 
On July 6, 2022, Bryant signed with the Los Angeles Lakers. On December 18, he made a game-winning dunk in a 119–117 win over his former team, 
the Washington Wizards. On January 22, 2023, Bryant tied his career high of 31 points, alongside 14 rebounds, in a 121–112 win over the Portland Trail Blazers.

Denver Nuggets (2023–present) 
On February 9, 2023, Bryant was traded to the Denver Nuggets in a four-team trade involving the Los Angeles Clippers and Orlando Magic.

Career statistics

NBA

Regular season

|-
| style="text-align:left;"|
| style="text-align:left;"|L.A. Lakers
| 15 || 0 || 4.8 || .381 || .100 || .556 || 1.1 || .4 || .1 || .1 || 1.5
|-
| style="text-align:left;"|
| style="text-align:left;"|Washington
| 72 || 53 || 20.8 || .616 || .333 || .781 || 6.3 || 1.3 || .3 || .9 || 10.5
|-
| style="text-align:left;"|
| style="text-align:left;"|Washington
| 46 || 36 || 24.9|| .581 || .407 || .741 || 7.2 || 1.8 || .5 || 1.1 || 13.2
|-
| style="text-align:left;"|
| style="text-align:left;"|Washington
| 10 || 10 || 27.1 || .648 || .429 || .667 || 6.1 || 1.5 || .4 || .8 || 14.3
|-
| style="text-align:left;"|
| style="text-align:left;"|Washington
| 27 || 9 || 16.3 || .520 || .286 || .875 || 4.0 || .9 || .2 || .8 || 7.4
|-
| style="text-align:left;"|
| style="text-align:left;"|L.A. Lakers
| 41 || 25 || 21.4 || .654 || .440 || .741 || 6.8 || .7 || .3 || .6 || 12.1
|- class="sortbottom"
| style="text-align:center;" colspan="2"|Career
| 211 || 133 || 20.4 || .603 || .364 || .758 || 5.9 || 1.2 || .4 || .8 || 10.6

College

|-
| style="text-align:left;"|2015–16
| style="text-align:left;"|Indiana
| 35 || 35 || 22.6 || .683 || .333 || .706 || 5.8 || 1.0 || .5 || .9 || 11.9
|-
| style="text-align:left;"|2016–17
| style="text-align:left;"|Indiana
| 34 || 34 || 28.1 || .519 || .383 || .730 || 6.6 || 1.5 || .8 || 1.5 || 12.6
|- class="sortbottom"
| style="text-align:center;" colspan="2"|Career
| 69 || 69 || 25.3 || .592 || .373 || .718 || 6.2 || 1.2 || .6 || 1.2 || 12.2

References

External links

 Indiana Hoosiers bio
 USA Basketball bio

1997 births
Living people
21st-century African-American sportspeople
African-American basketball players
American men's basketball players
Basketball players from New York (state)
Denver Nuggets players
Indiana Hoosiers men's basketball players
Los Angeles Lakers players
McDonald's High School All-Americans
Power forwards (basketball)
South Bay Lakers players
Sportspeople from Rochester, New York
Utah Jazz draft picks
Washington Wizards players